The Port of Hanko is a cargo port in the city of Hanko, on the south coast of Finland. Situated almost at the tip of the Hanko Peninsula, it is the southernmost of all Finnish ports.

Harbours
The port comprises three areas:
Western harbour: 5 RO-RO quays; depth 
Outer harbour: mostly used to import and store vehicles in free-trade zone facility; 2 quays; total length , depth ; also includes over  storage area
 harbour: focusing on bulk cargo; 2 quays; total length , depth ; also includes   of storage area

Traffic
With total annual international cargo throughput of 4.8 million tons in 2018, Hanko is the 6th biggest port in Finland by cargo tonnage. The total volume is fairly evenly split between exports and imports.

The Port of Hanko specialises in fast cargo liner traffic, with the major operators including , Finnlines and DFDS. Among the main categories of import cargo are cars and other vehicles, while exports consist largely of products of the forestry and paper industries.

Up to and including 2006, Hanko also handled passenger traffic, but this has since all but stopped.

See also
Russarö Lighthouse

References

External links

Hanko
Water transport in Finland
Hanko
Buildings and structures in Uusimaa